Chah Varz District is a District (bakhsh) in the  lamerd County, Fars Province, Iran. At the 2006 census, its population was 7,985, in 1,565 families. The district has 2 rural districts:
 Chah Varz Rural District has 4 villages
 Sheykh Amer Rural District

References 

Districts of Fars Province
Lamerd County